Mitsuo Fujikura is a Japanese mixed martial artist.

Mixed martial arts record

|-
| Loss
| align=center| 1-1-1
| Kenji Kawaguchi
| Submission (armbar)
| Shooto - Shooto
| 
| align=center| 2
| align=center| 0:41
| Tokyo, Japan
| 
|-
| Draw
| align=center| 1-0-1
| Yasuto Sekishima
| Draw
| Shooto - Shooto
| 
| align=center| 5
| align=center| 3:00
| Tokyo, Japan
| 
|-
| Win
| align=center| 1-0
| Suguru Shigeno
| Submission (kimura)
| Shooto - Shooto
| 
| align=center| 2
| align=center| 0:00
| Tokyo, Japan
|

See also
List of male mixed martial artists

References

External links
 
 Mitsuo Fujikura at mixedmartialarts.com

Japanese male mixed martial artists
Living people
Year of birth missing (living people)